A raglan sleeve is a sleeve that extends in one piece fully to the collar, leaving a diagonal seam from underarm to collarbone.

It is named after Lord Raglan, the 1st Baron Raglan, who is said to have worn a coat with this style of sleeve after the loss of his arm in the Battle of Waterloo.

The raglan mid-length sleeve is a popular undergarment (worn under the jersey) for baseball teams in MLB.

References

External links
 Raglan sleeve (sewing pattern) from stretchy.org
 Dictionary.com
 Raglan Sleeve DIY Pattern making from sewguide.com

Sleeves